The 2015 Las Vegas mayoral election took place on April 7, 2015, to elect the Mayor of Las Vegas, Nevada. The election was held concurrently with various other local elections, and is officially nonpartisan.

Incumbent Mayor Carolyn Goodman, an Independent in office since 2011, sought and won a second term in office.

Had no candidate received a majority of the vote in the first round, a runoff election would have been held on June 2.

Campaign
The major candidates were incumbent mayor Carolyn Goodman, an independent, and councilman and mayor pro-tempore Stavros Anthony, who was affiliated with the Republican Party.

A major item of debate was an attempt by Goodman to bring a Major League Soccer franchise to the city's downtown with a taxpayer-funded stadium. Stavros had been an outspoken critic of the project, and had opposed the project in the 4–3 City Council vote in favor of it.

Anthony's campaign spent more than $280,000, while Goodman's campaign spent more than $755,000.

Candidates
Stavros Anthony, Ward 4 Las Vegas city-councilman and mayor pro-tempore
 Phil "LOL" Cory, marketer
 Carolyn Goodman, incumbent Mayor
 Abdul Shabazz, perennial candidate

Results

References

2015
2015 Nevada elections
2015 United States mayoral elections